Acceleration Team Netherlands is the Dutch team of Formula Acceleration 1, an international racing series. They are run by the Belgian Azerti Motorsport team, owned by Wim Coekelbergs.

History

2014 season 
Drivers: Nigel Melker

The team announced Nigel Melker as their driver for the inaugural Formula Acceleration 1 season.

Drivers

Complete Formula Acceleration 1 Results

References 

Netherlands
A
Dutch auto racing teams